Karl Haffer also written as Carol Haffer (born 2 November 1912) was a member of the Romania men's national handball team, who took part in the 1936 Summer Olympics. On club level he played for Hermannstädter Turnverein in Romania.

He is the brother of handball player Fritz Haffer.

References

Romanian male handball players
Olympic handball players of Romania
Place of birth missing
1912 births
Field handball players at the 1936 Summer Olympics
Year of death missing